Monte Carlo: C'est La Rose is a 1968 American television special hosted by Princess Grace Kelly guiding the public through a tour of Monte Carlo. She encounters other celebrities such as Françoise Hardy, Terry-Thomas, Gilbert Bécaud, David Winters and his troupe the David Winters Dancers, who all perform musical numbers. We also meet her husband Rainier III, Prince of Monaco.

Plot
Princess Grace Kelly introduces us to the touristic attractions on Monte Carlo. She gives the historical background of the sites and it follows by performance by the guests.

The first site introduced is the Casino of Monte Carlo. In this location, Terry-Thomas acting in his  signature arch-typical Britisher, performs the song "The man who broke the bank at Monte Carlo".

In various segments we see the David Winters Dancers performing in the old town, and the Royal Palace while a hundred Royal guards stand at their post.

French teenage idol Françoise Hardy sings in one of its well known clubs.

Gilbert Bécaud' hit song ''C'est La Rose'' is used as the theme song, and he performs various song at the Monaco's Sporting club for the international Red Cross Gala.

Production 
According to The Times the director planned the shoot around the weather so it wouldn't be too sunny or dark. However at the time of the shoot Monte Carlo proved to be usually windy, they had to wait several hours before they could shoot a scene with Princess Grace Kelly where she wear a specific Dior gown. The production also caused traffic problems for the locals, especially when the princess was on set. Kelly did her own make-up for the shoot, and was waiting at the Royal palace between takes which created some hardship when coordinating scenes with her.

Release 
Produced by Wolper Production, the musical tour was released on ABC on March 6, 1968. It was among the top TV program that evening. Part of 3 hours eclectic program which consisted of various documentaries produced by Wolper, that started in the evening at 7:30 with a Jacques Cousteau documentary called The Savage World of the Coral Jungle, followed with Monte Carlo: C'est La Rose, and was finalized by a World War 2 documentary named The Rise and Fall of the Third Reich.

Reception 
Both on its own and as whole with the two other Wolper productions it was well received by the following reviewers.

Rick Du Brow of The Town Talk said of Princess Grace Kelly "The princess finally relaxed on television and was not only breathtakingly beautiful but quite charming as well" and said that the show was "a reasonably pleasant diversion".

The El Dorado Times published that it was "an artful and imaginative combination of guided tour, variety show and fashion show".

Cast

Grace Kelly
Françoise Hardy
Terry-Thomas
Gilbert Bécaud
Rainier III, Prince of Monaco
David Winters
Toni Basil
Anita Mann

See also
The Wedding in Monaco

External links

References 

1968 films
1968 in Monaco
American Broadcasting Company television specials
Documentary films about royalty
Documentary films about women
Films set in Monaco
1960s English-language films
Films directed by Michael Pfleghar